The following is a timeline of the history of the city of Kisangani, Democratic Republic of the Congo.

Prior to 20th century

 1875 - Town besieged by Arabs.
 1883 - Europeans arrive.
 1887 - Tippu Tip becomes governor of the Stanley Falls District in the colonial Congo Free State. 
 1899 - Cathédrale Notre-Dame du Rosaire built.

20th century
 1904 - Catholic Apostolic Prefecture of Stanley Falls established.
 1906 - Ponthiérville-Stanleyville  begins operating.
 1908 - Town becomes part of the colonial Belgian Congo.
 1913 - Justin Malfeyt becomes governor of Orientale Province.
 1921 - Ligne Aérienne du Roi Albert (Leopoldville-Stanleville) airline begins operating.
 1930 - October: Tornado occurs.
 1935 - Town becomes seat of the newly formed Stanleyville province.
 1947 - Town becomes seat of the Orientale Province.
 1955 - AS Nika (football club) formed.
 1957 - Bralima Brewery plant begins operating.
 1959 - Population: 126,533 (estimate).
 1960
 30 June: City becomes part of newly independent Republic of the Congo.
 July: Unrest.
 1964
 City taken by rebels during the Simba rebellion.
 November:  occurs.
 Stanleyville becomes capital of the newly created People's Republic of the Congo.
 1966
 July: Mercenaries' Mutiny attempted.
 Stanleyville renamed "Kisangani."
 1967 - Second Mercenaries' Mutiny occurs.
 1970
 Belgian king Baudouin visits city.
 Population: 216,526.
 1971
 Société Textile de Kisangani (manufactory) begins operating.
 City becomes seat of Haut-Zaïre province.
 1975 - Population: 297,888 (estimate).
 1980 - May: Catholic pope visits Kisangani.
 1981 - University of Kisangani established.
 1984 - Population: 317,581.
 1986 - "Diamond deposits...first discovered."
 1991 - September: City "pillaged...by rampaging soldiers."
 1992 - November: Riverboat shutdown begins.
 1993 - December: City again looted by soldiers.
 1994 - Population: 417,517.
 1996 - November: City besieged by "Zairian soldiers fleeing the war zone" during the First Congo War.
 1997
 March: City taken by rebel forces.
 City becomes seat of Haut-Congo province.
 2000 - June: Rwanda-Uganda armed conflict occurs in Kisangani.

21st century
 2002 - 14–15 May: Massacre.
 2003 - August: Arrival via Congo river of "first commercial delivery from the capital since the fighting began in 1998."
 2007 - Médard Autsai Asenga becomes provincial governor.
 2008 - Guy Shilton Baendo Tofuli becomes mayor.
 2010 - National military Camp Base in operation (approximate date).
 2011 - 8 July: Airplane crash occurs at Bangoka International Airport.
 2013 - Jean Bamanisa Saïdi becomes provincial governor.
 2015 - City becomes seat of Tshopo province (officially created in 2006).
 2016 -  becomes governor of Tshopo province.
 2017 - Constant Lomata becomes governor of Tshopo province.

See also
 Kisangani history
 Timelines of other cities in DR Congo: Bukavu, Goma, Kinshasa, Lubumbashi

References

This article incorporates information from the French Wikipedia and German Wikipedia.

Bibliography

in English
 
  (Novel set in fictional town similar to Kisangani)
  (Case study of Kisangani)
 
 
 

in French
 
 Élisabethville-Stanleyville par la route (Touring-Club du Congo belge, Léopoldville, 31 mars 1941, pp. 25–26 ; 30 avril 1941, pp. 46–47).

External links

  (Bibliography) (see also "Stanleyville")
  (Bibliography) (see also "Stanleyville")
 Items related to Kisangani, various dates (via Europeana)
 Items related to Stanleyville/Kisangani, various dates (via Digital Public Library of America)

Images

Kisangani
Kisangani
History of the Democratic Republic of the Congo
Democratic Republic of the Congo history-related lists
Years in the Democratic Republic of the Congo